Líbeznice is a municipality and village in Prague-East District in the Central Bohemian Region of the Czech Republic. It has about 3,000 inhabitants.

History
The first written mention of Líbeznice is in a document from 1236 issued by King Wenceslaus I of Bohemia.

Gallery

References

External links

 (in Czech)

Villages in Prague-East District